The Tower of Babel was the subject of three paintings by Pieter Bruegel the Elder. The first, a miniature painted on ivory, was painted while Bruegel was in Rome and is now lost. The two surviving paintings, often distinguished by the prefix "Great" and "Little", are in the Kunsthistorisches Museum, Vienna and the Museum Boijmans Van Beuningen in Rotterdam respectively.  Both are oil paintings on wood panels.

The Rotterdam painting is about half the size of the Vienna one. In broad terms they have exactly the same composition, but at a detailed level everything is different, whether in the architecture of the tower or in the sky and the landscape around the tower.  The Vienna version has a group in the foreground, with the main figure presumably Nimrod, who was believed to have ordered the construction of the tower, although the Bible does not actually say this.  In Vienna the tower rises at the edge of a large city, but the Rotterdam tower is in open countryside.

The paintings depict the construction of the Tower of Babel, which, according to the Book of Genesis in the Bible, was built by a unified, monolingual humanity as a mark of their achievement and to prevent them from scattering: "Then they said, 'Come, let us build ourselves a city, and a tower with its top in the heavens, and let us make a name for ourselves; otherwise we shall be scattered abroad upon the face of the whole earth.'" (Genesis 11:4).

Description and analysis
Bruegel's depiction of the architecture of the tower, with its numerous arches and other examples of Roman engineering, is deliberately reminiscent of the Roman Colosseum, which Christians of the time saw as a symbol of both hubris and persecution. Bruegel had visited Rome in 1552–1553. Back in Antwerp, he may have refreshed his memory of Rome with a series of engravings of the principal landmarks of the city made by the publisher of his own prints, Hieronymous Cock, for he incorporated details of Cock's engravings of Roman views in both surviving versions of the Tower of Babel.

The parallel of Rome and Babylon had a particular significance for Bruegel's contemporaries: Rome was the Eternal City, intended by the Caesars to last forever, and its decay and ruin were taken to symbolize the vanity and transience of earthly efforts. The Tower was also symbolic of the religious turmoil between the Catholic Church (which at the time conducted all services in Latin) and the polyglot Protestant religion that was increasingly popular in the Netherlands.  The subject may have had a specific topicality, as the famous Polyglot Bible in six languages, a landmark in Biblical scholarship, was published in Antwerp in 1566.  Although at first glance the tower appears to be a stable series of concentric pillars, upon closer examination it is apparent that none of the layers lies at a true horizontal. Rather the tower is built as an ascending spiral.

The workers in the painting have built the arches perpendicular to the slanted ground, thereby making them unstable, and a few arches can already be seen crumbling. The foundation and bottom layers of the tower had not been completed before the higher layers were constructed.

Lucas van Valckenborch, a contemporary of Bruegel's, also painted the Tower of Babel in the 1560s and later in his career, possibly after seeing Bruegel's depiction. Both were part of a larger tradition of painting the tower during the 16th and 17th centuries.  

The story of the Tower of Babel (like that in The Suicide of Saul, Bruegel's only other painting with an Old Testament subject) was interpreted as an example of pride punished, and that is no doubt what Bruegel intended his painting to illustrate. Moreover, the hectic activity of the engineers, masons and workmen points to a second moral: the futility of much human endeavour. Nimrod's doomed building was used to illustrate this meaning in Sebastian Brant's Ship of Fools. Bruegel's knowledge of building procedures and techniques is considerable and correct in detail. The skill with which he has shown these activities recalls that his last commission, left unfinished at his death, was for a series of documentary paintings recording the digging of a canal linking Brussels and Antwerp.

Both towers are shown partly-built with stone facings over a massive brick framework, a typical technique in Roman architecture, used in the Colosseum and other huge Roman buildings.  Grand and formal architecture of this sort is not a usual interest of Bruegel in either paintings or drawings, although it was typical subject matter for many of his contemporaries.  Nadine Orenstein, in discussing his only known drawing of buildings in Rome, concludes from the details taken from the Colosseum in both Tower paintings that he "must" have recorded them in drawings on his visit ten years before, but given the easy availability of prints this does not seem conclusive.

There are no surviving drawings that are studies for this or any other of Bruegel's paintings. This is despite indications that Bruegel did make use of preparatory studies. Both Tower versions are full of the type of details which are likely to have been worked out in sketches first.  Except for a lack of mountains, the paintings contain the main ingredients of the world landscape, a type of composition followed in many of Bruegel's earlier landscapes.  The Vienna tower is built around a very steep small mountain, which can be seen protruding from the architecture at the centre near the ground and to the right higher up.

Provenance
On the Vienna painting, there is a stone block directly in front of the king which is signed and dated "Brvegel. FE. M.CCCCC.LXIII" (where Bruegel FE. is short for "Bruegel a fait en", French for "[painted] by Bruegel, in [1563]"). It was painted for the Antwerp banker Nicolaes Jonghelinck, one of Bruegel's best patrons, who owned no fewer than 16 of his paintings.

Gallery of details (Vienna version)

In popular culture

Novels
The painting of the miniature on ivory is described in a chapter of the Rudy Rucker novel As Above, So Below: A Novel of Peter Bruegel. However, the image of the painting that appears on p. 26 in the novel is of the 1563 oil painting on oak panel in the Vienna Kunsthistorisches Museum. (see p. 360 in Acknowledgments).

The painting is also featured on the cover of Paul Graham's 2004 book, Hackers & Painters. Artist Lothar Osterburg created a series of works influenced by The Tower of Babel under the title "Babel" (2015–7), which include photogravures, a stop-motion video, and a 28-foot sculpture installation built entirely from old books.

In video games
The painting appears as the main element on one box art design of the video game Civilization III.

They are briefly mentioned in  1997 video game Shadowman, where Jaunty explains that Bruegel was shocked at how The Asylum resembled his paintings.

In the 2005 video game Shadow of the Colossus, The Shrine of Worship is clearly a reference to The tower of Babel, especially considering that the name of the main antagonist is Dormin, which is "Nimrod" spelled backwards.

The painting also makes an appearance in the 2012 video game, Call of Duty: Black Ops 2, in the zombie survival mode in the map, 'Green Run' on a wall in a section of the map (Town).

The 2016 video game Let it Die features a homage to the painting. Showing the in-game 'Tower of Barbs' with nearly identical features as the original work with a modern urban motif and Death standing in place of King Nimrod.

In music
Brazilian rock band Titãs used the painting as the cover of their 2014 album Nheengatu.

See also
Tower of Babel
Tower of Babel (M. C. Escher)

References

Sources
 (full text free online)
Snyder, James. Northern Renaissance Art, 1985, Harry N. Abrams,

External links

The Tower at the KHM
The "Little" Tower of Babel at Museum Boijmans Van Beuningen 

1560s paintings
Paintings in the collection of the Kunsthistorisches Museum
Paintings in the collection of the Museum Boijmans Van Beuningen
Paintings depicting figures from the Book of Genesis
Paintings by Pieter Bruegel the Elder
Tower of Babel
Architecture paintings
Tower of Babel in art
1563 paintings
Nimrod
Lost paintings